Arthur Fils and Giovanni Mpetshi Perricard were the defending champions but chose not to participate.

Edas Butvilas and Mili Poljičak won the title, defeating Gonzalo Bueno and Ignacio Buse in the final, 6–4, 6–0.

Seeds

Draw

Finals

Top half

Bottom half

References

External links 
Draw at rolandgarros.com
Draw at ITFtennis.com

Boys' Doubles
French Open by year – Boys' doubles